Jarred Daniel Rome (December 21, 1976 – September 21, 2019) was an American discus thrower. His personal-best throw was 68.76 meters, achieved on August 7, 2011, in Chula Vista. He was the Throws Coach at Boston University in Boston, Massachusetts. He graduated in 2000 from Boise State University and was inducted into the Boise State Hall of Fame in 2007.

Achievements
Jarred won the 2011 USA Outdoor Track & Field Championships in Eugene, Oregon. This was his 4th consecutive world championship berth. His throw of 63.99m or 209 feet 11 inches gave him his first USA championship win. In college at Boise State University he had both the Indoor and Outdoor Shot Put (I62'6) (O63'11.75) and Outdoor Discus (210'00) school records and was the runner up in the 1997 NCAA Outdoor Championships. He was a six-time All American while attending Boise State.

Personal life

Rome was raised in Marysville, Washington, and graduated from Marysville Pilchuck High School in 1995.

On August 5, 2017, he married Boston University Athletic Hall of Fame Field Hockey player (and former US National Team member 2008–2012), Pamela Spuehler. The two met while training in Chula Vista, California, at the Olympic Training Center in 2010.

On September 21, 2019, he was found dead in Marysville after attending an induction ceremony for the Snohomish County Sports Hall of Fame. On November 13, 2019, the Snohomish County Medical Examiners office released the official cause of death. Jarred Rome died as the result of a fentanyl overdose.

References

External links
 
 
 
 
 

1976 births
2019 deaths
American male discus throwers
Athletes (track and field) at the 2004 Summer Olympics
Athletes (track and field) at the 2012 Summer Olympics
Athletes (track and field) at the 2011 Pan American Games
Drug-related deaths in Washington (state)
Olympic track and field athletes of the United States
Pan American Games medalists in athletics (track and field)
Pan American Games silver medalists for the United States
People from Marysville, Washington
Track and field athletes from Washington (state)
USA Outdoor Track and Field Championships winners
Medalists at the 2011 Pan American Games